The 1980 Avon Championships of Kansas  was a women's tennis tournament played on indoor carpet courts at the Municipal Auditorium  in Kansas City, Missouri in the United States that was part of the 1980 Virginia Slims World Championship Series. It was the second edition of the tournament and was held from January 14 through January 20, 1980. First-seeded Martina Navratilova won the singles title and earned $24,000 first-prize money.

Finals

Singles
 Martina Navratilova defeated  Greer Stevens 6–0, 6–2
 It was Navratilova's 2nd singles title of the year and the 36th of her career.

Doubles
 Billie Jean King /  Martina Navratilova defeated  Laura duPont /  Pam Shriver 6–3, 6–1

Prize money

References

External links
 Women's Tennis Association (WTA) tournament details
 International Tennis Federation (ITF) tournament edition details

Avon Championships of Kansas
Virginia Slims of Kansas
Avon Championships of Kansas
Avon Championships of Kansas
Avon Championships of Kansas